Joe Henderson Quintet at the Lighthouse is a live album recorded at the Lighthouse Café, Hermosa Beach, California, between September 24, 1970 and September 26, 1970. Personnel include Woody Shaw on trumpet and flugelhorn, George Cables on electric piano, Ron McClure on acoustic bass (electric bass on track 8 only), and Lenny White on drums. Tony Waters plays congas on tracks 1, 8 and 9.

Track listing
The 2004 CD release (Milestone, MCD-47104-2) contains performances of the following compositions:

Tracks 1, 5, 6 and 8-10 were originally released on If You're Not Part of the Solution, You're Part of the Problem. Track 7 was originally released on In Pursuit of Blackness/Black Is the Color. All tracks were subsequently released on Joe Henderson: The Milestone Years.

Personnel
Joe Henderson – tenor saxophone
Woody Shaw – trumpet, flugelhorn
Ron McClure – bass, electric bass
George Cables – electric piano
Lenny White – drums
Tony Waters – congas (tracks: 1, 8, 9)

Reception
In a review for AllMusic, Ron Wynn said: "Firehouse playing from the wonderful team of Henderson and Woody Shaw."

References

1970 live albums
Jazz albums by American artists